Gu Jianren (13 January 1932 – 27 September 2022) was a Chinese oncologist who was a professor at Shanghai Medical College, and an academician of the Chinese Academy of Engineering.

Biography
Gu was born in Suzhou, Jiangsu, on 13 January 1932, to Gu Weicheng, a doctor and founder of Suzhou No. 2 People's Hospital. Gu attended Caoqiao Primary School, Jingfan Middle School, and Suzhou Youyuan High School affiliated to Fudan University. In 1948, he was accepted to Shanghai Medical College and worked at Shanghai Cancer Institute after graduation. He was a visiting scholar at Beatson Cancer Institute between 1979 and 1981. In 1985, he founded the National Key Laboratory of Oncogenes and Related Genes and served as director from 1985 to 2002. In 2014, he became honorary director of both Renji Hospital affiliated to the Medical College of Shanghai Jiaotong University and the Shanghai Cancer Research Institute.

On 27 September 2022, he died of an illness in Shanghai, at the age of 90.

Personal life 
Gu married Fang Lijun, who was a classmate at university.

Publication

Honours and awards
 1995 Member of the Chinese Academy of Engineering (CAE)
 1997 Science and Technology Progress Award of the Ho Leung Ho Lee Foundation

References

Bibliography
 

1932 births
2022 deaths
People from Suzhou
Engineers from Jiangsu
Chinese oncologists
Fudan University alumni
Academic staff of Shanghai Jiao Tong University
Members of the Chinese Academy of Engineering